Famigo (stylized FAMIGO) is a digital content marketplace for content creators. Based in Phoenix and Miami, the platform is accessible via website and application. Famigo is a portmanteau of "family" and "amigo".

History 
In 2017, FAMIGO was co-founded by Maria Luna, Hector Rodriguez, and Adam Swanton primarily as a mobile application on Android and iOS. It was marketed as a monetization platform for independent artists, musicians, creators, and influencers.

From 2019 to 2020, the company launched a beta web-based subscription marketplace that allowed the creators to engage fans with monthly subscriptions of exclusive digital content. After testing with a small group of content creators, it launched as FAMIGO on September 21, 2021 (during Latin Music Week) and is currently available in 55 countries.

References 

American companies established in 2017
Technology companies of the United States
Technology companies established in 2017